The South Redford School District is in Redford, a suburb of Detroit. In May 2005, residents of the South Redford School District passed the 2005 Bond Facilities Proposal. The $32.65 million bond allowed the District to make substantial up grades, repairs and improvements to the facilities across the entire school district.

Pierce Middle School was built in 1959.

Mission Statement: Staff, students, parents and the community working together to ensure continuous learning and success.

Schools

References

My School Data Dashboard

External links
Website

School districts in Michigan
Education in Wayne County, Michigan
Redford, Michigan